"Alan's Psychedelic Breakfast" is the fifth and final track from the 1970 Pink Floyd album Atom Heart Mother, credited to the whole group. It is a three-part instrumental.

Recording and sounds
The track features Pink Floyd playing in the background as Pink Floyd roadie Alan Styles (1936 – 2011) speaks about the breakfast he is preparing and eating, as well as breakfasts he has had in the past ("Breakfast in Los Angeles. Microbiotic stuff..."). There are significant breaks before the first and in between all three instrumental parts where only Alan's muttering and movements, with occasional exterior background noise, are heard. Much of Alan's speech is overdubbed throughout the piece in gradually fading echoes. For example, "Microbiotic stuff" is repeated every couple of seconds, more quietly each time. It was performed live three times in the United Kingdom during the winter of 1970.

In addition to the talking, the sounds of Alan making breakfast—such as lighting the stove, cooking bacon, pouring milk and cereal (which makes a popping sound associated with Kellogg's Rice Krispies), loudly gulping and drinking, and loudly and vigorously eating cereal—are clearly audible in the background, which adds a conceptual feel to the track. Alan can be heard entering the kitchen and gathering supplies at the start of the track, and washing up and exiting the kitchen at the end; a dripping tap can be heard during both of these instances. On some copies of the vinyl version, the dripping tap at the end of the song is cut into the run-off groove, so it plays on infinitely until the listener removes the stylus from the album. On the CD and digital release, the dripping continues for approximately 17 seconds after all other sounds have ceased.

Sections

Rise and Shine (0:00-3:33)
This piece consists of two pianos, bass, Hammond organ, a steel guitar fed through a Leslie speaker and hi-hats.

During the opening of this section, Alan can be heard muttering to himself, deciding what to have as he begins to prepare his breakfast. He can be heard saying the following: "Oh... Er... Me flakes... Scrambled eggs, bacon, sausages, tomatoes, toast, coffee... Marmalade, I like marmalade... Yes, porridge is nice, any cereal... I like all cereals... Oh, God.  Kickoff is 10am." At the end of this section, the sound of a whistling kettle can be heard as the music stops.

Sunny Side Up (3:33-7:45)
This piece takes the form of a modified fugue, and was written and performed entirely by David Gilmour on two acoustic guitars and a steel guitar.

Morning Glory (7:45-13:00)
This piece was performed by the entire band. The main instrument is Richard Wright's piano, which was overdubbed three different times (one in the left channel, one in the centre, and one in the right channel). The piece also features very prominent bass, electric guitar, ADTed drums, and Hammond organ. At the end, after saying "My head's a blank", Alan picks up his car keys and leaves via the door. Faintly, a car can be heard starting and driving away.

Reception
In a review for the Atom Heart Mother album, Alec Dubro of Rolling Stone described "Alan's Psychedelic Breakfast" as "the only redeeming feature on [side 2 of Atom Heart Mother], but only partially so." Dubro found "the integrated Arising and Breakfast sounds" as the redeeming factor, not the music in the track itself. In a less-than-enthusiastic review, Stephen Deusner of Paste described "Alan's Psychedelic Breakfast" as "a cut-and-paste assemblage of sounds that never coalesces into much of anything." Because Deusner enjoyed "If" and "Fat Old Sun", he was disappointed Pink Floyd ended Atom Heart Mother with this track. In another review for the Atom Heart Mother album, Irving Tan of Sputnikmusic described the track as an 'incredibly effective form of "wallpaper music'". However, Tan also described the track as not so much a "song", but rather an ambient psychedelic sketch.

In 2018, Ultimate Classic Rock contributor Bryan Wawzenek ranked the piece among Pink Floyd's worst songs, deeming it to be a "13-minute slab of musique concrete fulfills a request that (probably) no Floyd fan ever made: 'What does roadie Alan Styles like for breakfast, can we hear him making it and could the guys in the band noodle around (in a very non-psychedelic manner) as he fries bacon, muses about marmalade and pours a bowl of Rice Krispies?'. Vulutre writer Bill Wyman deemed to be the suite to be another from the band's "dreariest period", but said: "The argument for this junk, I suppose, is that the band, despite its space-rock leanings, was much more down to earth and organic, as opposed to the flights of high electronic fantasy offered by your King Crimsons and the other, more energetic progressive-rock outfits of the time." However, he still criticised the anonymity of the musicians, saying: "If this is supposed to be organic, there’s no personality to the music."

Personnel
 David Gilmour – steel, acoustic and electric guitars
 Roger Waters – tape effects, tape collage, bass guitar
 Richard Wright – piano, Hammond organ
 Nick Mason – drums, percussion, tape edits, tape collage, additional engineering

with:

 Alan Styles – voice, sound effects

Cultural references
 The album The Dark Side of the Moog V (1996) by Klaus Schulze and Pete Namlook is subtitled "Psychedelic Brunch".
 Jam band The Breakfast (founded as Psychedelic Breakfast in 1998) have taken their name from the song.

References

1970 songs
Pink Floyd songs
Rock instrumentals
1970s instrumentals
Songs written by Nick Mason
Songs written by David Gilmour
Songs written by Roger Waters
Songs written by Richard Wright (musician)
Song recordings produced by David Gilmour
Song recordings produced by Roger Waters
Song recordings produced by Richard Wright (musician)
Song recordings produced by Nick Mason
Musique concrète
Ambient songs
Psychedelic songs